The architecture of Costa Rica includes remains from the pre-Columbian Era, all the way to modern buildings that form part of the nation's contemporary infrastructure. There is a unique architectural landscape present in Costa Rica that is reflective of the nation's history and vibrant culture. The nation encompasses an array of historical buildings from both the pre-colonial era and post-colonial era, such as Guayabo and the Basilica of Our Lady of the Angels. The contemporary architectural scene in Costa Rica has also captured global attention, exemplified by structures such as Casa Flotanta. Architecture in Costa Rica is reflective of the nation's environmental conservation policies. This is reflected in the distinctive and extensive presence of canopy bridges throughout the nation, constructed in the aim of preventing rainforest destruction.

Background 

Costa Rica is renowned for its vivacious culture which encompasses Indigenous practises, Spanish colonial influences, and various immigrant cultural customs. It is heavily influenced by the Spanish, due to the historic Spanish colonisation of the Americas in the 16th century.

Historic sites in Costa Rica 
Architecture in Costa Rica encompasses an array of historically rich buildings and structures. Minimal structures remain in Costa Rica from the pre-Columbian era, which is a large attraction of many other nations in Latin America. This is the result of early architecture in Costa Rica being constructed from wood, which has not withstood the years. Examples of pre-Columbian era constructions in Latin America include Machu Picchu and the Pyramid of the Sun. These were built by various ancient civilisations such as the Incas and Aztecs. Many prominent historical buildings in Costa Rica are instead from the Colonial era. Architecture from this era is very similar in style to Spanish architecture, due to the colonial rule and presence Spain exerted over the nation.

Prominent historical architectural sites in Costa Rica include Guayabo, Basílica de Nuestra Señora de los Ángeles and Las Ruinas de la Parroquia.

Guayabo 

The Guayabo de Turrialba is an archaeological site located in the Cartago Province of Costa Rica. The site is one of the few architectural remains of the pre-Columbian era in Costa Rica, and is the nation's largest ancient architectural site. Guayabo is assumed to have been a town or city, due to remains of stone paved streets, aqueducts, housing foundations, drawings of animals and stone carvings. The artefacts found in Guayabo date back to approximately 1000 BC, however it is still not confirmed as to why the site was abandoned by civilisation. A potential reason is the close proximity of Guayabo to the Turrialba Volcano. The area is also prone to high magnitude earthquakes, with the area being located at the centre of a series of intersecting fault lines. Furthermore, the location of Guayabo is very secluded, situated in the mountains of Guayabo national park. It can take up to an hour to travel there, requiring a car and hiking. In 1891, an excavation was conducted in a cemetery in Guayabo, with artefacts from the excavation being displayed at the Historical American Exposition at Madrid and then the World's Columbian Exposition in Madrid.

Basilica of Our Lady of the Angels, Cartago 

The Basílica de Nuestra Señora de los Ángeles translates to Our Lady of the Angels Basilica is a Roman Catholic basilica located in Cartago, built in the colonial era in 1639. It was restored and redesigned in 1939, following damages caused by a series of earthquakes that are very common in the Cartago area. The restoration was conducted by architect Luis Llach Llagos in the Byzantine style.

The basilica is devoted to the Virgen de los Angeles who is known as la Negrita; the patron saint of Costa Rica. A pilgrimage occurs annually on the 2nd of August, with people from across Costa Rica complete a 22 km walk from San Jose to the basilica. The pilgrimage is known as the Romeria, and is a very significant and long held Costa Rican tradition.

Las Ruinas de la Paroquia 

Las Ruinas de la Parroquia, or the Santiago Apóstol Parish Ruins, are a Costa Rican heritage site constructed in the colonial era in honour of the Roman Catholic Church. The ruins were once a Church, and the site is dedicated to St. James the Apostle. Multiple churches have been built on the site, as a result of reoccurring damage caused by earthquakes. Today only the outer walls of the last constructed church remain.

The legend of the Cartago ruins 
Folktale exists around the establishment and construction of the Church, A popular story describes the fight of two brothers; a bitter priest and a single man, who fell in love with the same woman. The woman fell in love with the single man who was loved by all, making the priest resentful. In 1577, during the New Year's Eve mass, the priest killed his brother with a knife. As penance, he constructed the first church on the site. Locals and tour guides encourage the story that the headless ghost of the brother haunts the site to this day.

Modern architectural sites 
Contemporary architecture in Costa Rica is unique, with modern structures built in keeping with traditional techniques, while still boasting an aesthetic and modern appearance. Costa Rican Architecture mimics the culture of the nation, utilising artistic elements to create statement pieces that attract global audiences. Examples of impressive modern architectural sites include Containers of Hope, Tropical Atrium, and Casa Flotanta. All three buildings are unique in their design and construction, commissioned by renowned Costa Rican architect Benjamin Garcia Saxe under his company, Studio Saxe.

Containers of Hope 

The Containers of Hope is a house located in San Jose in Costa Rica. The house consists essentially of two recycled shipping containers that have been renovated, and placed on pier foundations. The house is owned by Gabriela Calvo and Marco Peralta, who wanted a house that was not overly expensive but would suit their needs. To minimise expenses in the construction of their house, they did some of the work themselves. The house features a raised central area, which enables natural light. The house also has large clerestory windows, creating a cross breeze and ventilation. The house also features wooden floors.

Saxe has been commended on his ability to keep the overall price of the house to US$40,000, and his use of recycled materials.

Jungle Frame House 
The Jungle Frame house, or 'Tropical Atrium' as it has been nicknamed, is a house in Nosara, Costa Rica. It was completed in late 2018 as a holiday house.  It is 340 squared meters in size, and the site is surrounded by dense jungle. The house is designed to blend in with the natural surroundings of the jungle, and thus not impose itself on its surroundings. The materials chosen to build the house reflect this, utilizing modular metal elements in conjunction with wooden accents. This use of prefabricated materials enabled a fast construction process with minimal impact on the surrounding natural environment. Additionally, the house features solar hot water and energy, to minimise the carbon footprint of guests.

The internal structure of the house is centered around an atrium, which extends through all three floors. This feature of the house is how it received its nickname. Furthermore, the atrium enables a large passage of natural light flow throughout the house, as well as natural ventilation. Shade is created by a screen of wooden panels throughout the house, to avoid overheating.
The layout of the house is very open plan, with main living area grounded on the jungle floor. This design feature is intentional, hoping to elicit a connection between ‘human habitation and the natural world that surrounds us’.

Casa Flotanta 
Casa Flotanta is a house located in Puntarenas, Costa Rica. It was completed in 2013 and overlooks the Pacific Ocean. The house is unique in construction, due to the steep, sloping nature of the site it is built on. Construction of other houses in the surrounding area involved the formation of large retaining walls, which cut into the slope. This disrupts the soil and vegetation of the area. However, Casa Flotanta is unique, built on large piers to give the impression that the house is ‘floating above the hillside’. This design style is economically efficient, saving the expense of constructing retaining walls and also enabling the natural vegetation and environment to continue to thrive under and around the house. Thus, the house is not disruptive to the rich eco-system prominent in Costa Rica, whilst providing highly praised ocean views.

The house consists of three separate structures, which are staggered to ensure that all the rooms have ocean views. These rooms are connected by short bridge walkways. Furthermore, ventilation is achieved through the open planned nature of the house and the projecting roofs. The bamboo shafts used throughout the house enable a wide-scale influx of light to filter throughout the rooms. Additionally, due to high rates of seismic activity in Costa Rica, the house was constructed from pre-fabricated galvanized steel.

Canopy bridges in Costa Rica 

Canopy bridges are a unique, but large part of Costa Rican architecture. They are a major part of the tourism industry, enabling people to experience the rainforests, which are an integral part of visiting Costa Rica, without damaging the habitat of the various flora and fauna. Furthermore, the canopy bridges generally span valleys, enabling fast access from one side of a gorge to another. Without these bridges, steep ascents and descents would be required. Thus, not only do the bridges aid in the preservation of Costa Rica's vast rainforests, they also make exploring these areas more efficient.

Canopy bridges are carefully engineered, with designers having to construct and install them, to have minimal impact on their surrounding environment. They are created from pre-fabricated materials to minimise damage to environmental site upon construction. Additionally, they are generally made from material such as metal that is strong enough to withstand the weather conditions of Costa Rica. Canopy bridges are also commonly used by animals, such as monkeys, as a means of transportation across steep gorges.

Many companies exist, offering guided tours of surrounding national park. These companies generally also offer other experiences, such as zip-lining and guided tours.

References 

 
Central American architecture